Milnrow is a tram stop on the Oldham and Rochdale Line (ORL) of Greater Manchester's light-rail Metrolink system. It opened to passengers on 28 February 2013 and is located in Milnrow, a part of the Metropolitan Borough of Rochdale, England.

The station sits on the site of Milnrow railway station, a regional rail station which opened on 2 November 1863 and closed on 3 October 2009 for conversion from heavy rail to light rail. It was along the Oldham Loop Line, which operated from Manchester to Rochdale via Oldham and thus was almost identical to the current Metrolink route.

History

At the time the station opened it was as part of a new line from Oldham Mumps to Rochdale East Junction, and created a Middleton Junction to Rochdale route. In 1880 a line was built from Oldham Werneth to Thorpes Bridge Junction near Newton Heath. Subsequently, the whole Thorpes Bridge Junction to Rochdale East Junction route became known as the Oldham Loop Line. The pattern of train services on the Oldham Loop Line involved a greater number of trains serving the Oldham stations, and less services continuing on to Milnrow and Rochdale. In the 1960s and 1970s fewer and fewer trains ran from Oldham Mumps to Rochdale, and in May 1972 the Secretary of State for Transport announced that this part of the Oldham Loop including Milnrow Station would be closed. The closure did not go ahead because what later became the Greater Manchester Passenger Transport Executive (GMPTE) agreed to fund the continuation of services (though the line through the station was subsequently singled between Rochdale & Shaw). The involvement of the GMPTE also lead to a more frequent pattern of trains serving the Oldham Mumps to Rochdale section including Milnrow.

The station closed on 3 October 2009 for the conversion of the line to Metrolink and re-opened as Milnrow tram stop on 28 February 2013.
The route was re-doubled as part of the conversion work to allow a more frequent service to operate than before.

Services

Milnrow is located on the Oldham & Rochdale Line with trams towards Manchester city centre and Rochdale railway station. Services are mostly every 12 minutes on all routes.

Connecting bus routes

Gallery

References

External links

Metrolink stop information
Milnrow area map

Tram stops in the Metropolitan Borough of Rochdale
Former Lancashire and Yorkshire Railway stations
Railway stations in Great Britain opened in 1863
Railway stations in Great Britain closed in 2009
Railway stations in Great Britain opened in 2013
Tram stops on the East Didsbury to Rochdale line